Michael Bell (1 October 1936 – 20 May 2011) was an Irish Labour Party politician. Bell was first elected to Dáil Éireann as a Teachta Dála (TD) for the Louth constituency at the November 1982 general election and retained his seat until losing it at the 2002 general election. He was a trade union official before entering politics. He served on Drogheda Corporation and Louth County Council and was mayor of Drogheda between 1983 and 1984. He died in May 2011.

Bell served with the Local Defence Force (FCÁ) for 29 years, in which he completed a full-time stint on the Irish border between 1969 and 1970 during The Troubles as a senior NCO and had overseen the care of 1,100 Northern Irish refugees at Gormanston Camp in County Meath.

References

1936 births
2011 deaths
Labour Party (Ireland) TDs
Local councillors in County Louth
Members of the 24th Dáil
Members of the 25th Dáil
Members of the 26th Dáil
Members of the 27th Dáil
Members of the 28th Dáil
Politicians from County Louth
Mayors of places in the Republic of Ireland
Military personnel from County Louth